Carina Paim (born 3 May 1999) is a Portuguese Paralympic athlete who competes in international elite events. She specialises in the 400 metres, she is a World bronze medalist and a European champion. She took up track and field after being inspired by watching Allyson Felix on the television.

References

1999 births
Living people
People from Portimão
Paralympic athletes of Portugal
Portuguese female sprinters
Medalists at the World Para Athletics Championships
Medalists at the World Para Athletics European Championships
Athletes (track and field) at the 2016 Summer Paralympics
Athletes (track and field) at the 2020 Summer Paralympics
Sportspeople from Faro District